The 1975 English cricket season was the 76th in which the County Championship had been an official competition. The inaugural Cricket World Cup was won by West Indies, who defeated Australia in an exciting final. Australia toured England to compete for the Ashes and won the series 1–0. Leicestershire won their first County Championship title.

Honours
County Championship - Leicestershire
Gillette Cup - Lancashire
Sunday League - Hampshire
Benson & Hedges Cup - Leicestershire
Minor Counties Championship - Hertfordshire
Second XI Championship - Surrey II 
Wisden - Ian Chappell, Peter Lee, Rick McCosker, David Steele, Bob Woolmer

World Cup

Test series

England played a four-Test Ashes series against Australia but lost the first at Edgbaston following Mike Denness's surprising decision to put Australia in. The other three were drawn, the one at Headingley being abandoned in controversial circumstances when the pitch was destroyed overnight by political protestors.  Australia therefore retained the Ashes.

County Championship

Gillette Cup

Benson & Hedges Cup

Sunday League

Leading batsmen

Leading bowlers

References

Annual reviews
 Playfair Cricket Annual 1976
 Wisden Cricketers' Almanack 1976

External links
 CricketArchive – season and tournament itineraries

 
English cricket seasons in the 20th century